Colney is a village in the western outskirts of Norwich in the English county of Norfolk.

History
Colney's name is of Anglo-Saxon origin and derives from the Old English for 'Cola's' island.

Colney is listed in the Domesday Book as a settlement of 34 households in the hundred of Humbleyard. The village was divided between the estates of Roger Bigod, Godric the Steward and William d'Ecouis.

Geography
According to the 2011 Census, Colney is a settlement of 153 residents living in 58 households.

Colney falls within the constituency of South Norfolk and is represented at Parliament by Richard Bacon MP of the Conservative Party.

St. Andrew's Church
Colney's parish church is one of Norfolk's remaining 124 round-tower churches and is dedicated to Saint Andrew.

Amenities
Greenacres Memorial Park is located within the village which is a facility for natural burials, scaterring of ashes and a Memorial Hall for the celebration for wakes and wedding receptions.

The John Innes Centre and Quadram Institute, both parts of the Norfolk and Norwich University Hospital are located within the village.

Norwich City's Lotus Training Ground is located in Colney.

War Memorial
Colney's war memorial takes the form of a Celtic cross located close to Old Watton Road. It lists the following names for the First World War:
 Lieutenant David S. Barclay (1897-1917), 1st Battalion, Scots Guards
 Lance-Corporal Frederick Z. Goldsmith (d.1917), 1st Battalion, Border Regiment
 Private George S. Heaton (1898-1918), 11th Battalion, Essex Regiment
 Private Donald W. Henning (1898-1917), 7th Battalion, Royal Norfolk Regiment

And, the following for the Second World War:
 Sergeant Frederick W. Barrie (1921-1943), No. 199 Squadron RAF
 Marine Frederick Eastwick

Notes 

Villages in Norfolk
Civil parishes in Norfolk